Rupert Ashby Cave Rogers (27 May 1902 – 2 May 1976) was an English cricketer who played a single first-class match, a friendly for Worcestershire against Warwickshire in 1919. Batting at three in his only innings, he made only 3. He took no wickets from his five overs, but held one catch, to dismiss Warwickshire opener Horace Venn.

Rogers was later known as Rupert Ashby Cave-Rogers.

Notes

References
 
 

1902 births
1976 deaths
English cricketers
Worcestershire cricketers